SMSH can refer to:
South Miami High School ("South Miami Senior High")
South Mississippi State Hospital